Messias José Baptista (24 May 1968 – 11 September 2005) was a Brazilian athlete. He competed in the men's triple jump at the 1996 Summer Olympics. He died from complications of leukemia aged 37.

References

External links
 

1968 births
2005 deaths
Athletes (track and field) at the 1996 Summer Olympics
Brazilian male triple jumpers
Olympic athletes of Brazil
Place of birth missing
Deaths from leukemia
Deaths from cancer in São Paulo (state)
Athletes from São Paulo